Bouchut may refer to : 
 Christophe Bouchut (1966-), a French race driver
 Eugène Bouchut (1818-1891), a French physician